The 27th Canadian Film Awards were held on October 24, 1976 to honour achievements in Canadian film. The ceremony was hosted by Lorne Greene, and was held at the conclusion of the inaugural 1976 Festival of Festivals.

The 1976 awards were noted for the introduction of the Golden Reel Award, presented to the year's top-grossing Canadian film.

Winners

Films
Feature Film: Lies My Father Told Me — Pentimento Productions and Pentacle VIII Productions, Harry Gulkin and Anthony Bedrich producers, Ján Kadár director
Theatrical Documentary: Ahô: The Forest People — Productions Via le Monde, François Floquet, Daniel Bertolino producers and directors
Documentary: Volcano: An Inquiry into the Life and Death of Malcolm Lowry — National Film Board of Canada, Donald Brittain and Robert Duncan producers, Donald Brittain and John Kramer directors
Theatrical Short: Cooperage — Rocky Mountain Films, Phillip Borsos producer and director
Animated Short: The Street — National Film Board of Canada, Guy Glover producer, Caroline Leaf director
Arts and Experimental: Barbara Is a Vision of Loveliness — Lightworks, R. Bruce Elder producer and director
TV Drama: For Gentlemen Only — National Film Board of Canada, Vladimir Valenta producer, Michael Scott director

Feature Film Craft Awards
Performance by a Lead Actor: André Melançon - Partis pour la gloire (Bound for Glory)  (NFB)
Performance by a Lead Actress: Marilyn Lightstone - Lies My Father Told Me  (Pentimento Productions/Pentacle VIII Productions)
Supporting Actor: Frank Moore - The Far ShoreSupporting Actress: Tedde Moore - Second Wind (Olympic Films)
Art Direction: Anne Pritchard - The Far ShoreCinematography: Richard Leiterman - The Far ShoreDirection: Harvey Hart - Goldenrod  (Talent Associates)
Film Editing: Donald Shebib - Second Wind (Olympic Films)
Sound Editing: Maurice Schell - Lies My Father Told Me  (Pentimento Productions/Pentacle VIII Productions)
Music Score: Lewis Furey - La tête de Normande St-Onge (Normande)  (Cinépix/Productions Carle-Lamy)
Original Screenplay: Not awardedAdapted Screenplay: Ted Allan - Lies My Father Told Me  (Pentimento Productions/Pentacle VIII Productions)
Overall Sound: Henri Blondeau (recording), Richard Voriser and Stephen Dalby (re-recording) - Lies My Father Told Me  (Pentimento Productions/Pentacle VIII Productions)

Non-Feature Craft Awards
Performance by a Lead Actor: Ed McNamara and Hugh Webster - For Gentlemen Only  (NFB)
Performance by a Lead Actress: Luce Guilbeault - Bargain Basement (NFB)
Supporting Actor or Actress: David Gardner - The Insurance Man from Ingersoll (CBC)
Art Direction: Not awardedCinematography: Robert Ryan - Killers of the Wild  (Superstar International)
Direction: Donald Brittain and John Kramer - Volcano: An Inquiry into the Life and Death of Malcolm Lowry  (NFB)
Film Editing: John Kramer - Volcano: An Inquiry into the Life and Death of Malcolm Lowry  (NFB)
Sound Editing: Les Halman and Abbey Neidik - Volcano: An Inquiry into the Life and Death of Malcolm Lowry  (NFB)
Music Score: Alain Clavier - Volcano: An Inquiry into the Life and Death of Malcolm Lowry  (NFB)
Screenplay: David King - For Gentlemen Only  (NFB)
Non-Dramatic Script: Donald Brittain and John Kramer - Volcano: An Inquiry into the Life and Death of Malcolm Lowry  (NFB)
Sound Recording: Roland Martel and Carle Delaroche-Vernet - Ahô: The Forest People  (Productions Via le Monde)
Sound Re-Recording: Joe Grimaldi and Austin Grimaldi - The Last Cause (Sandy McLeod Productions)

Special AwardsThe Last Cause, Sandy McLeod Productions, William Brennan producer - "for its monumental compilation of historic footage".
Dennis Zahoruk - for his first feature film, Brethren.
Golden Reel Award: Lies My Father Told Me, Harry Gulkin and Anthony Bedrich producers, "for highest-grossing film".
Wendy Michener Award: Caroline Leaf - "for her contribution to the art of animation" in The Street''.
John Grierson Award: Tom Daly - "for outstanding contributions to Canadian cinema".

References

Canadian
1976 in Canadian cinema
Canadian Film Awards (1949–1978)
Scarborough, Toronto